Restricted area may refer to:

 An area that only authorized people can enter; see also exclusion zone
 Restricted area, a zone within the key of a basketball court
 A departure area after the customs counters in most airports